Bački Petrovac is a town and municipality located in the South Bačka District of the autonomous province of Vojvodina, Serbia. The town has a population of 7,452, while Bački Petrovac municipality has 13,418 inhabitants.

Name
In Serbian Cyrillic the town is known as Бачки Петровац, in Serbian Latin as Bački Petrovac, in Slovak as Petrovec or Báčsky Petrovec, in Hungarian as Petrőc, and in German as Petrovacz.

Bački Petrovac is the economical, cultural and administrative center of the municipality. It is a settlement of a town character, while the other three are villages of Pannonian type.

History
Being in south Bačka which according to special climatic and other conditions is one of the most fertile parts of Serbia, very suitable for settling down, here in this region people made their settlements very early. The first written records about Petrovac appears in the 13th century when Petrovac is mentioned as a church parish belonging to Bač County. Later that name is changed into Petrovac. Its first inhabitants were the Hungarians and Serbs. In the first half of the 18th century (1745) the Slovaks settled here. Since then Petrovac developed so that it represents cultural, economic, clerical and political center of the Slovaks in this region.

Inhabited places

Bački Petrovac municipality includes the town of Bački Petrovac and the following villages:
 Gložan
 Kulpin
 Maglić

Note: for the places with Slovak majority, the names are also given in Slovak.

Demographics

According to the 2011 census results, the municipality has 13,418 inhabitants.

Ethnic groups
The ethnic Slovaks form a majority of the population in the municipality. Settlements with Slovak majorities are: Bački Petrovac (Slovak: Báčsky Petrovec), Gložan (Slovak: Hložany), and Kulpin (Slovak: Kulpín). There is one settlement with a Serb majority: Maglić. The town is located in southern Bačka (hence the name), some 25 km northwest of Novi Sad, the capital of Vojvodina. It is the cultural center of Slovaks in the province, and other places in the eponymous municipalities are also inhabited by many Slovaks.

The ethnic composition of the municipality:

Economy
Agriculture is the most important economic activity based on the production of field crops (wheat, corn, broom weed, sugar beet, hop), cattle, breeding dud ponetry and vegetable crops. Besides agriculture there is also some industry manufacture, metal and chemical. Manufacture of wood civil engineering, printing activities, etc.

The following table gives a preview of total number of employed people per their core activity (as of 2017):

Gallery

International relations

Twin towns — Sister cities
Bački Petrovac is twinned with:
  Babušnica, Serbia
  Martin, Slovakia
  Nitra, Slovakia
  Ružomberok, Slovakia
  Stará Ľubovňa,  Slovakia
  Vukovar,  Croatia
  Kirchheim unter Teck,  Germany

See also
 List of places in Serbia
 List of cities, towns and villages in Vojvodina

References
 Slobodan Ćurčić, Broj stanovnika Vojvodine, Novi Sad, 1996.

External links

 
 Ján Kollár Grammar School 
 Petrovec Online community 
 Matica slovenská v Srbsku 
 Vladimír Hurban Vladimírov Theatre 
 Hlas Ľudu weekly magazine 

 
Places in Bačka
Populated places in South Bačka District
Municipalities and cities of Vojvodina
Slovak communities in Serbia
Towns in Serbia